The Boston Ideal Banjo, Mandolin and Guitar Club was an American musical quintet composed of virtuoso artists of the banjo, mandolin, and guitar.  Founded in 1887, it was reputed to be the first ensemble of fretted instrument artists on the East Coast formed for professional appearances and nationwide concert tours.  The prevailing critical acclaim in major cities throughout the country was highly complimentary.

Founding members 

 Albert Deane Grover (1865–1927)
 H. W. Harris
 Bert Eldon Shattuck (born 1856)
 George L. Lansing (born approx 1855)
 L. H. Galeucia.

Shattuck was the inaugural editor of Gatcomb's Banjo & Guitar Gazette launched in 1887 by the L. B. Gatcomb Company of Boston. Galeucia was the next editor.

References 

Musical groups from Boston
Musical groups established in 1887
1887 establishments in Massachusetts